The women's 20 kilometres walk at the 2019 World Athletics Championships was held at the Khalifa International Stadium in Doha, Qatar, on 29 September 2019.

Records
Before the competition records were as follows:

Schedule
The event schedule, in local time (UTC+3), was as follows:

Results
The race was started at 23:59.

References

Women's 20 kilometres walk
Racewalking at the World Athletics Championships